Senator Leedy may refer to:

James K. Leedy (1924–1983), Ohio State Senate
John W. Leedy (1849–1935), Kansas State Senate
Robert Franklin Leedy (1863–1924), Virginia State Senate